Carlip is a surname. Notable people with the surname include:

 Hillary Carlip (born 1956), American author and artist
 Steve Carlip (born 1953), American physicist

See also
 Carlin (name)